The Peak Scaler is a 1933 German drama film directed by Franz Wenzler and starring Franz Schmid, Walter Krieger and Mizzl Bardorf.

The film's art direction was by Otto Erdmann and Hans Sohnle.

Cast
 Franz Schmid as Franzl Schmid
 Walter Krieger as Bertl
 Mizzl Bardorf as Mizzl
 Anni Trautner as Die Zimmervermieterin
 Traudl Ertl as Traudl
 Theodor Loos as Ein Herr im Hotel
 Paul Rehkopf as Der Grenzbeamte
 Emil Matousek as Winkelmann
 Theo Lingen as Ein Kellner
 Gustl Gstettenbaur as Ein Pikkolo
 Heini Aberle as Edwin, Handwerksbursche
 Hans Schurich as August, Handwerksbursche

References

Bibliography

External links 
 

1933 films
1933 drama films
German drama films
Films of the Weimar Republic
1930s German-language films
Films directed by Franz Wenzler
Mountaineering films
Films set in the Alps
German black-and-white films
1930s German films